Zhaoji is a township-level division situated in Funan County, Fuyang, Anhui, China.

See also
List of township-level divisions of Anhui

References

Township-level divisions of Anhui